Florbela is a feminine given name.

List of people with the given name 

 Florbela Espanca (1894–1930), Portuguese poet
 Florbela Malaquias (born 1959), Angolan politician
 Florbela Oliveira (born 1974), Portuguese actress

See also 

 Florbela, 2012 Portuguese film

Feminine given names
Portuguese feminine given names